The Wild Weird World of Dr. Goldfoot was a 30-minute TV special which was a sequel to Dr. Goldfoot and the Bikini Machine (1965).

It aired on ABC as an episode of Shindig! in November 1965.

Plot
Dr. Goldfoot and his assistant Hugo send their robot woman Diane to entrap Malcolm Andrews, who contains all the knowledge of the world in his head. Diane sets out to seduce Andrews but is stopped by government agent 001/2 of Security Intelligence Command (SIC). Diane and the agent begin a romance, and Goldfoot and Hugo capture Andrews.

Diane brings the agent to Goldfoot's lair where Goldfoot intends to kill him. However Diane turns against Goldfoot and overpowers him. There is a floorshow.

Cast
 Vincent Price as Dr. Goldfoot
 Tommy Kirk as Malcolm Andrews
 Susan Hart as Diane
 Aron Kincaid as Agent 00½
 Harvey Lembeck as Hugo
 Patti Chandler
 Mary Hughes
 Sally Sachse
 Luree Holmes
 Sue Hamilton
 Ed Garner

Production
According to Susan Hart, the film was the idea of Ruth Pologe, head of AIP publicity in the New York office, who arranged with ABC to do a special relating to the picture. Jack Baker did the choreography.

Songs
Guy Hemric and Jerry Styner wrote the music and lyrics for the songs with Les Baxter as musical director. There are three main songs:
 "Dr Goldfoot and the Bikini Machine" – sung over the opening credits.
 "It Works" – a number sung by Hugo (Harvey Lembeck), explaining the machine.
 "What's a Boy Supposed to Do?" – a love duet between Susan Hart and Aron Kincaid.
 "Among the Young" – an instrumental number performed while Goldfoot's robots do a dance.

References

External links
 

1965 television specials
1960s American television specials
American Broadcasting Company television specials
American International Pictures films
1965 films
1960s English-language films